"Summer Jam" is a song by German-Belgian dance music group The Underdog Project. Released on 24 July 2000 as the lead single from their album It Doesn't Matter, the song was considered a big hit in Europe, peaking at #3 in both Germany and Portugal, #5 in Hungary, #10 in Austria, #14 in Italy, and #17 in Switzerland. After that, the single aired on some of the most popular radio stations in the US like WPOW in Miami and New York City's WKTU.

"Summer Jam 2003", released in 2003, featured samples of The Sunclub's 1997 hit "Fiesta De Los Tamborilero" and was similarly successful, topping the charts in both Belgium and the Netherlands and reaching the Top 5 in Denmark, France, and Romania, the Top 20 in the UK, and the Top 40 in Sweden and Switzerland.

Lyrics and music
Songwriter and composer(s): Vic Krishna, Christoph Brux, Toni Cottura, Craig Scott Smart, Stephan Browarczyk, Shahin Moshirian

Track listings

Summer Jam
 CD single - Germany
 "Summer Jam" (Original Radio Edit)
 "Summer Jam" (2-step Radio Edit)
 "Summer Jam" (Acappella)
 "Summer Jam" (Dennis The Menace Club Mix)

 UK CD single (2001)
 "Summer Jam" (Radio Edit) - 3:29
 "Summer Jam" (Full Version) - 4:30
 "Summer Jam" (The B-15 Project Remix) - 5:28
 "Summer Jam" (Mr. Shabz Remix) - 3:53
 "Summer Jam" (Free Heads Club Mix) - 6:30
 "Summer Jam" (Greenfields Pancake Jam) - 5:47

Summer Jam 2003
 CD single
 "Summer Jam 2003" (DJ F.R.A.N.K.'s Summermix Radio Version) — 3:48
 "Summer Jam 2003" (DJ Hardwell Bubbling Mix F Edit) — 3:40
			
 CD single
 "Summer Jam 2003" (DJ F.R.A.N.K.'s Summermix Radio Version) — 3:48
 "Summer Jam 2003" (DJ F.R.A.N.K.'s Summermix Extended Version) — 5:08
 "Summer Jam 2003" (DJ Hardwell Bubbling Mix) — 5:08

 12" maxi
 "Summer Jam 2003" (Dubaholics Wailing Mix) — 5:16
 "Summer Jam 2003" (Original Extended Mix) — 4:30
 "Summer Jam 2003" (Free Heads Mix) — 6:30
 "Summer Jam 2003" (Free Heads Dub)

Charts

Weekly charts

Original release (2000)

"Summer Jam 2003", The Underdog Project vs The Sunclub (2003)

Year-end charts

Decade-end charts

Certifications

References

External links
 lyrics of Summer Jam

2000 debut singles
2003 singles
Ultratop 50 Singles (Wallonia) number-one singles
Dutch Top 40 number-one singles
The Underdog Project songs
2000 songs
PolyGram singles
Songs written by Toni Cottura
Songs written by Christoph Brüx